The Fire-class fireboats/yard tractor tugs were two fireboats operated by the Royal Canadian Navy.

Design and construction
Firebird was based at CFB Halifax, and Firebrand at CFB Esquimalt. According to the Canadian American Strategic Review the class was designed by naval architects Robert Allan Limited, and were built at Vancouver Shipyards in North Vancouver in 1978, and later acquired by the Canadian Forces.

The ships were powered by two  azimuthing Z-drives and one hydraulic tunnel bow thruster. The ships had a crew of five firefighters.

The Fire class was equipped with three manually-controlled  water cannons, two diesel-driven fire pumps capable of expending 2,500 gpm at 150 psi each.

Ships in class

Service history
In 2008, Firebird helped extinguish a fire aboard the former Canadian Coast Guard vessel  in Halifax harbour.

On 4 December 2012 the Department of National Defence published a Letter of Interest (LOI)/Request for Information (RFI) for Canadian shipbuilders interested in building replacements for the Glen-class tugs¸ and Fire-class fireboats.

A single class would replace both the tugs and the fireboats, and would be operated by civilian crews. The replacement vessels would have water cannons that could be controlled remotely, by a single individual. The replacement vessels would have bollard pull of 40 tons—almost six times as much as the 7.5 tons the Fire-class vessels are capable of.

On 29 January 2014, the availability of Firebird to fight fires was reduced due to budget cuts, being on standby only during weekdays during normal working hours. On 4 December 2014, Firebird was taken out of service in Halifax, and placed on the disposal list as a result of budget cuts. The ship will be replaced using tugboats from around the harbour.

Replacement

On 29 April 2019 the Government of Canada announced Ocean Industries of Isle-aux-Coudres, Quebec was awarded the contract to build four tow-tug/rescue vessels to replace both the Fire-class fireboat/tractor tugs and Glen-class yard tugs with delivery expected from 2021 to 2023. The new tugs will be staffed by civilian crews and be restricted to the naval base/yard only.

References

Ships of Canada
 
Tugboats of the Royal Canadian Navy
Auxiliary fireboat classes